Usedom-Süd is an Amt in the district of Vorpommern-Greifswald, in Mecklenburg-Vorpommern, Germany. The seat of the Amt is in the town Usedom.

The Amt Usedom-Süd consists of the following municipalities:

Ämter in Mecklenburg-Western Pomerania